James Chabot Provincial Park is a provincial park in British Columbia, Canada.  Formerly Athalmer Beach Provincial Park, it is located in Invermere at the northeast end of Windermere Lake in the Columbia Valley region of the East Kootenay.  Windermere Lake Provincial Park is located at the lake's southwestern end.

It is named for James Chabot, aka Jim Chabot, MLA for Columbia-Revelstoke from 1963 to 1986 and former Minister of Lands, Parks and Housing in the regime of Social Credit Premier W.A.C. Bennett.

See also
List of British Columbia provincial parks

References

Provincial parks of British Columbia
Columbia Valley
1979 establishments in British Columbia
Protected areas established in 1979